Paku Karen Baptist Association, also known as Paku Kayin Baptist Association is a Baptist Christian denomination in Myanmar. It is affiliated with the Karen Baptist Convention.

History
It was founded in 1856 by the American Baptist Mission.

With the departure of American Baptist missionaries from Myanmar, the association has been entirely staffed by nationals. After the PKBA reconstituted, the first executive secretary was Rev Letta. Now, PKBA has 150 churches. PKBA headquarters are in Taungoo, Bago Division. There are four regions: Bago Division East, Bago Division West, Karen States and Kayah States.

It had Paku High School, and the first headmaster was Rev Cross (ABM). Today it's No.5 Basic Education High School.

Member of
Myanmar Council of Churches
Myanmar Baptist Convention
Karen Baptist Convention

Executive secretaries
Rev Letta (B.Th)
Rev Kooler (B.RE)
Rev. Dr Augustus Spurgeon (B.A (Hons) (UOT, Taungoo)), B.Th (MIT, Yangon), M.Min (TTC, Singapore), D.Min (CRCDS, USA)), D.D (ULCM, USA)
Rev Caleb Paw
Rev Paul Htoo 
Rev Dr Nee Doh Htoo ( current )

Departments
Christian Endeavour Dept (Youth Dept) (CE)
Women Dept
Religious Education Dept (RE)
Evengelical and Mission Dept (E&M)
Minsters Association Dept (MA)
Treasury Dept
Paku Divinity School
Paku Christian Centre
PCSSDD Dept (Development Dept)
Urban Mission Dept (UM)
PKBA Clinic (IDP Project)
Security Department
Facility Department

Compound

Sesquicentennial Hall (Max Cap 1000)
Offices
Football field
Staff Housing
Paku Divinity School
Library
Paku Town Baptist Church
Recreation Center
Hall (Max Cap 400)
Paku Christian Center
2 Boarders

Fellowship
Bwe Karen Baptist Association, Taungoo HQ
Keh Ko Keh Ba Karen Baptist Association, Taungoo HQ
http://www.adventistyearbook.org/default.aspx?page=ViewAdmField&Year=9999&AdmFieldID=CMYM
http://www.anglicancommunion.org/tour/diocese.cfm?Idind=338&view=alpha
http://www.gcatholic.org/dioceses/diocese/taun1.htm

References 
https://web.archive.org/web/20080709035459/http://www.oikoumene.org/en/member-churches/regions/asia/myanmar-burma/myanmar-baptist-convention.html
http://www.mcc-mm.org/
https://web.archive.org/web/20120227181848/http://www.pakudivinityschool.webs.com/

Baptist Christianity in Myanmar
Baptist denominations in Asia
Baptist denominations established in the 19th century